Cyprus competed at the 2016 European Athletics Championships in Amsterdam, Netherlands, between 6 and 10 July 2016.

Results

Men

Track & road events

Field Events

Women

Track & road events

Field Events

References

2016
Nations at the 2016 European Athletics Championships
2016 in Cypriot sport